R. Kevin Clinton served as the 45th Treasurer of Michigan.

Early life
Clinton was born in Detroit, Michigan.

Education
Clinton earned a  B.A. in business administration and an M.A. in actuarial sciences from the University of Michigan.

Career
Clinton has worked in the insurance business, serving as president and CEO of two companies, Americans Physicians Capital Inc. and MEEMIC. Clinton appointed to the position of Michigan Commissioner of Insurance by Governor Rick Snyder on April 16, 2011 and served in this position until 2013. On November 1, 2013, Clinton was again appointed by Governor Snyder, this time to the position of Treasurer of Michigan on November 1, 2013, and served in this position until his resignation in 2015. Clinton resigned to once again pursue business in the private sector. In 2017, Clinton was named director of the Michigan Catastrophic Claims Association.

References

Living people
American actuaries
Businesspeople from Detroit
Politicians from Detroit
State treasurers of Michigan
University of Michigan alumni
21st-century American politicians
Year of birth missing (living people)